Admiral Sir Morgan Singer,  (13 December 1864 – 27 April 1938) was a Royal Navy officer who went on to be Commander-in-Chief, America and West Indies Station.

Naval career
Singer joined the Royal Navy in 1877, and was promoted to lieutenant on 13 December 1885. In January 1903 he was appointed in command of the protected cruiser HMS Prometheus, serving with her in the Channel Fleet for a year. He was promoted to captain on 31 December 1903. By 1908 he was captain of the cruiser .

He served in World War I and was appointed Director of Naval Ordnance in August 1914 taking responsibility for the Admiralty's entire supply of guns, torpedoes and mines. He continued in that post until March 1917.

Promoted to vice admiral in February 1919, he became Commander-in-Chief, America and West Indies Station the same month. He was appointed KCB later that year, and went on to be Commander-in-Chief of Coastguards and Reserves in 1921. He became a full Admiral in 1924.

He died in Winchester in Hampshire in 1938.

Family
In 1899 he married Emily Mary Desborough.

References

1864 births
1938 deaths
Royal Navy admirals of World War I
Knights Commander of the Order of the Bath
Knights Commander of the Royal Victorian Order